USS Minnesota may refer to:

  was a wooden steam frigate launched 1 December 1855 and sold in August 1901.

See also
 
 

United States Navy ship names